Keity Drennan Britton (born 24 July 1990) is a Panamanian model and beauty pageant titleholder who the winner of the Miss International Panamá 2011 and Miss Panamá 2016 title. She also participated in Miss Panamá 2011 where she won the title of Virreina Panamá and represented Panama at Miss Universe 2016 pageant where she placed in the Top 13.

Early life
Drennan was born in Panama City, Panama. Her father is from the United States and her mother is a Panamanian of Indian ancestry. She graduated from the high school at American College in Panama City.  She said in a press junket that she changed her last name to Drennan because her biological father recognized her.

Modelling career
The start of her modeling career took place when she won the "Chica Chico Modelo" contest in 2008. It gave Drennan the chance to work for Physical Modelos, her official modeling agency as of today and to represent Panamá in the Ford Model's Supermodel Of The World 2008.

In the same year, Keity represented Panama in the Miss Teen America and the Caribbean, making three awards: Miss Teen Photogenic, Miss Teen Model and Third Princess contest.

Pageantry

Miss Panamá 2011
Drennan is 5 ft 9 in (1.77 m) tall, and competed in the national beauty pageant Miss Panamá 2011, obtained the title of Virreina Panamá. She represented the state of Panamá Centro.

Miss International 2011
She represented Panama in the Miss International 2011 pageant, held in Chengdu, China on November 6, 2011. She finished as 4th runner-up.

Miss Panamá 2016
Drennan was selected in a casting made on April 26, 2016 where she was selected as Miss Panamá 2016 to represent Panama in Miss Universe 2016.

Miss Universe 2016
Drennan represented Panama at Miss Universe 2016 where she placed in the Top 13.

See also
 Miss Panamá 2011
 Miss Panamá 2016

References

External links
 Panamá 2011 official website
 Miss Panamá
 Miss Panamá blogspot

1990 births
Living people
Panamanian beauty pageant winners
Panamanian female models
Panamanian people of American descent
Señorita Panamá
Panamanian people of Indian descent
Miss Universe 2016 contestants
Miss International 2011 delegates